Mid-Town Historic District is a national historic district in Springfield, Missouri, United States. It encompasses 455 buildings, 8 structures, and 7 objects in a predominantly residential section of Springfield. It developed between about 1871 and 1952, and includes representative examples of Late Victorian, Colonial Revival, and Bungalow / American Craftsman architecture, including the separately listed Bentley House and Stone Chapel. Other notable buildings include those on the Drury College campus, Central Christian Church (1926), St. Johns Episcopal Church (1886), Mary S. Boyd School (1911), and Trinity Lutheran Church (c. 1919).

The district was added to the National Register of Historic Places in 1989 with a boundary increase in 2002.

References

Historic districts on the National Register of Historic Places in Missouri
Victorian architecture in Missouri
Colonial Revival architecture in Missouri
Buildings and structures in Springfield, Missouri
National Register of Historic Places in Greene County, Missouri